Lost and Found is the second of 3 mixtapes by Tinchy Stryder, It was released on 24 October 2006 on the label Boy Better Know. The mixtape sees Stryder rapping with Wiley, who featured on Stryders first mixtape, I'm Back U Know, and the mixtape also features a few members of Ruff Sqwad. It features a collection of 14 unreleased tracks that had never been heard before the release of the mixtape, and Underground which was released in 2005.

Track listing

References

2006 albums
Tinchy Stryder albums